Melzerodontia is a genus of toothed crust fungi in the family Corticiaceae. The genus contains three species that are found in Africa.

Species
Melzerodontia aculeata Hjortstam & Ryvarden (1980)
Melzerodontia rasilis Hjortstam & Ryvarden (1997)
Melzerodontia udamentiens P.Roberts (2000)

References

External links

Corticiales
Agaricomycetes genera
Taxa named by Leif Ryvarden